Hiroshi Abe (born c. 1922) was a Japanese soldier and a repenting war criminal. As a first lieutenant in the Imperial Japanese Army's Fifth Rail Regiment during World War II, he supervised construction of the Burma Railway at Songkurai. Over twelve thousand Allied prisoners of war died under his supervision.

Abe was sentenced to death by hanging as a B/C class war criminal and imprisoned in Changi Prison. In 1947, his sentence was commuted to 15 years. He was released in 1957."The construction of the railway was in itself a war crime. For my part in it, I am a war criminal."Cook, Haruko Taya., and Theodore Failor. Cook. Japan at War: an Oral History. Phoenix, 2000.

In 1995, Abe testified against the Japanese government in a lawsuit seeking compensation for Koreans in Japan during World War II. "This was probably the first time for a former Japanese officer to testify in court in the trial of war compensation issues."

References

External links
Abe's re-union with former POW Ron Upton

1920s births
Possibly living people
Japanese people convicted of war crimes
Prisoners and detainees of Singapore
Japanese people imprisoned abroad
Imperial Japanese Army personnel of World War II
Imperial Japanese Army officers
Japan Ground Self-Defense Force personnel
Prisoners sentenced to death by the British military